Cristian Ionuț Săpunaru (born 5 April 1984) is a Romanian professional footballer who plays mainly as a centre-back for Liga I club Rapid București, which he captains. He can also be deployed as a right-back or a defensive midfielder.

Săpunaru began his senior career with Național București in 2002, before going on to make a name for himself at Rapid București four years later. In 2008 he signed with Porto in Portugal, where he won ten major honours over the course of four years, including the 2010–11 UEFA Europa League. After two additional seasons in Spain featuring for Zaragoza and Elche, Săpunaru spent his late years with stints between his native country and Turkey.

A full international for Romania between 2008 and 2019, he amassed 36 caps and represented the nation in two European Championships.

Club career

Early career / Porto
Săpunaru was born in Bucharest and is a product of Național București, joining its youth system at the age of only six. He signed for Rapid București in July 2006, and two years later was sold for €2.5 million to Porto as a replacement for Chelsea-bound José Bosingwa. Săpunaru agreed to a five-year contract, with the Primeira Liga club owning 50% of the player's economic rights, while Romanian sources indicated the price was actually €6 million plus two players.

During his debut campaign, Săpunaru was the first-choice right-back as the northerners achieved a double, and scored his first goal in a 1–2 away loss against Nacional for the Taça da Liga. In early February 2010, he was suspended in Portugal–as his teammate Hulk–following incidents during a 0–1 league defeat at Benfica, so he returned to his country for a five-month loan with former side Rapid; he did not manage to be played regularly at Porto during that time but, following his return for the 2010–11 season, became a very important first-team unit as they won three major titles, appearing in 40 official games in the process.

On 17 February 2014, Săpunaru was condemned to pay a €90,000 fine for his participation in the assault of two stewards at the Estádio da Luz on 20 December 2009.

Spain
On 31 August 2012, Săpunaru signed a one-year contract with La Liga club Real Zaragoza. He made his official debut on 16 September, playing the full 90 minutes in a 0–2 loss at Real Sociedad.

In his first season in Aragon, Săpunaru started but also suffered team relegation. He also entered his name in the competition's history books, after breaking the record for the most bookings in a single campaign (19 yellow cards and one red). 

After initially hesitating because of the requests of his partner, Săpunaru signed a one-year deal at fellow league team Elche on 25 July 2013. He totalled only nine appearances in his only campaign and was also sent off twice, while his sole goal opened a 1–2 loss at Valencian Community neighbours Levante on 13 December.

Elche could not support Săpunaru's €1 million wage demands, and released him on 21 August 2014. In October 2015, he took the club to court for the wages remaining in his contract.

Later career
After four months back at Rapid, Săpunaru signed a season-long deal at Pandurii Târgu Jiu on 6 September 2015, including a clause that he could leave instantly if a foreign club wanted him. The following 21 July, he put pen to paper to a two-year contract with fellow league side Astra Giurgiu.

On 1 July 2017, it was announced that Săpunaru signed a two-year deal with Turkish Süper Lig team Kayserispor.  At its expiration, he joined Denizlispor in the same competition, before returning to his previous employer in January 2020 for the rest of the season. In August, he signed a new one-year deal.

Săpunaru signed for Rapid for the fourth time on 4 July 2021, joining on a two-year contract at the age of 37.

International career
Săpunaru made his debut for the Romania national team on 31 May 2008 against Montenegro, and was selected to the nation's squad at UEFA Euro 2008, although he did not play in the final stages. From June 2011 to November 2015, he did not appear in any games for his country due to a conflict with manager Victor Pițurcă.

On 17 May 2016, Săpunaru was picked by manager Anghel Iordănescu for his Euro 2016 squad. He started at right-back in the group stage opener, a 1–2 loss against the hosts France. In September 2019, after amassing 36 caps over the course of eleven years, 35-year-old Săpunaru announced his retirement from the national team.

Career statistics

Club

International

Honours
Național București
Cupa României runner-up: 2005–06

Rapid București
Cupa României: 2006–07
Supercupa României: 2007

Porto
Primeira Liga: 2008–09, 2010–11, 2011–12
Taça de Portugal: 2008–09, 2010–11
Supertaça Cândido de Oliveira: 2009, 2010, 2011, 2012
UEFA Europa League: 2010–11
UEFA Super Cup runner-up: 2011

Astra Giurgiu
Cupa României runner-up: 2016–17

Individual
Gazeta Sporturilor Romanian Footballer of the Year third place: 2011
Gazeta Sporturilor Romania Player of the Month: August 2021

References

External links

 
 
 
 
 
 
 

1984 births
Living people
Footballers from Bucharest
Romanian footballers
Association football defenders
Liga I players
Liga II players
FC Progresul București players
FC Rapid București players
CS Pandurii Târgu Jiu players
FC Astra Giurgiu players
Primeira Liga players
FC Porto players
La Liga players
Real Zaragoza players
Elche CF players
Süper Lig players
Kayserispor footballers
Denizlispor footballers
Romania under-21 international footballers
Romania international footballers
UEFA Euro 2008 players
UEFA Euro 2016 players
Romanian expatriate footballers
Expatriate footballers in Portugal
Expatriate footballers in Spain
Expatriate footballers in Turkey
Romanian expatriate sportspeople in Portugal
Romanian expatriate sportspeople in Spain
Romanian expatriate sportspeople in Turkey
UEFA Europa League winning players